Nadarajan "Raj" Chetty (born August 4, 1979) is an Indian-American economist and the William A. Ackman Professor of Public Economics at Harvard University. Some of Chetty's recent papers have studied equality of opportunity in the United States and the long-term impact of teachers on students' performance. Offered tenure at the age of 28, Chetty became one of the youngest tenured faculty in the history of Harvard's economics department. He is a recipient of the John Bates Clark Medal and a 2012 MacArthur Fellow. Currently, he is also an advisory editor of the Journal of Public Economics. In 2020, he was awarded the Infosys Prize in Economics, the highest monetary award recognizing achievements in science and research, in India.

Education and early career
Raj Chetty was born in New Delhi, India and lived there until the age of nine. His family immigrated to the United States in 1988. Chetty graduated from University School of Milwaukee in 1997 and earned his AB from Harvard University in 2000. He continued at Harvard to earn his PhD in 2003, completing a dissertation under the direction of Martin Feldstein, Gary Chamberlain, and Lawrence F. Katz with a thesis titled Consumption commitments, risk preferences, and optimal unemployment insurance. As a sophomore in college, Chetty was told by his mentor Feldstein to pursue his own ideas after proposing a counterintuitive idea that higher interest rates sometimes lead to higher investment.

In 2003, at the age of 24, Chetty became an assistant professor of economics at the University of California, Berkeley, becoming a tenured associate professor there at 28. In 2009, Chetty returned to Harvard, where he was the Bloomberg Professor of Economics and the director of the Lab for Economic Applications and Policy. In 2015, Chetty moved to Stanford, where he became a professor in the Economics Department. In June 2018, Raj Chetty's frequent coauthor John Friedman announced that Chetty will be returning to Harvard. In July of the same year, he became a Founding Director of Opportunity Insights with John Friedman and Nathaniel Hendren.

Research
In 2011 with John Friedman and Jonah Rockoff, Chetty found that test-score based value-added measures are not substantially biased by unobserved student characteristics and that the students of high value-added teachers have markedly better outcomes later in life. Drawing on these findings, Chetty testified in the landmark case Vergara v. California in support of the plaintiffs’ key points: that teacher quality has a direct impact on students’ achievements and that the current dismissal and seniority statutes have disparate impact on minority and low-income students.

Chetty is also known for research showing that economic mobility varies enormously within the United States and for work on the optimal level of unemployment benefits.

Recognition
In 2008, The Economist and The New York Times listed Chetty as one of the top eight young economists in the world. Chetty is among the most cited young economists in the world. In 2010, he received the Young Labor Economist Award from the Institute for the Study of Labor for his paper "Moral Hazard Versus Liquidity and Optimal Unemployment Insurance" in the Journal of Political Economy.

In 2012, he was one of 23 fellows to receive $500,000 over the following five years from the John D. and Catherine T. MacArthur Foundation as a recipient of one of the Foundation's Genius Grants.

Chetty was the recipient of the 2013 John Bates Clark Medal, awarded by the American Economic Association to "that American economist under the age of forty who is adjudged to have made a significant contribution to economic thought and knowledge."

Chetty was awarded the Padma Shri, an award for distinguished service in any field, by the Government of India in 2015.

George Mason University economist Tyler Cowen described Chetty in 2017 as "the single most influential economist in the world today."

Research by Chetty was covered by The New York Times, The Atlantic, Our World in Data, and Vox.

In 2018, he was elected a member of the National Academy of Sciences.

In 2019, he received an Andrew Carnegie Fellowship, awarded by the Carnegie Corporation of New York.

In December 2020, he received the Infosys Prize for Social Sciences – Economics "for his pioneering research on identifying barriers to economic opportunity and for developing solutions to help people escape from poverty towards better life outcomes."

Publications
Google Scholar profile

References

External links
 Professor Raj Chetty at Harvard
 Winner of The American Magazine 2008 Young Economist Award
 Winner of the IZA 2010 Young Labor Economist Award
 Harvard Economics welcomes Raj Chetty to the Position of Professor of Economics

1979 births
21st-century American economists
American academics of Indian descent
Fellows of the American Academy of Arts and Sciences
Fellows of the American Academy of Political and Social Science
Fellows of the Econometric Society
Harvard University alumni
Harvard University faculty
Labor economists
Living people
MacArthur Fellows
Microeconometricians
Recipients of the Padma Shri in trade and industry
Stanford University Department of Economics faculty
University of California, Berkeley faculty
University School of Milwaukee alumni